Carl Wilhelm Tölcke (31 May 1817 in Eslohe, Sauerland – 30 November 1893 in Dortmund) was a German Social democratic politician, the "father of  Social democracy in Westphalia" and president of the General German Workers' Association.

References

1817 births
1893 deaths
People from Hochsauerlandkreis
People from the Province of Westphalia
General German Workers' Association politicians
Social Democratic Party of Germany politicians